Major General Sir Henry Guy Riley KBE CB (1884–1964) was a senior British Army officer during the Second World War.

Biography
Born on 5 November 1884, Guy Riley was educated at Bedford School. He joined the North Staffordshire Regiment in 1906, served during the First World War, and was mentioned in dispatches twice. He was Paymaster-in-Chief at the War Office between 1937 and 1943.

Major General Sir Guy Riley was invested as a Companion of the Order of the Bath in 1938, and as a Knight Commander of the Order of the British Empire in 1944. He retired from the British Army in 1943 and died on 24 October 1964.

References

1884 births
1964 deaths
British Army generals
People educated at Bedford School
British Army personnel of World War I
British Army personnel of World War II
Companions of the Order of the Bath
Knights Commander of the Order of the British Empire